Argences-en-Aubrac is a commune in the department of Aveyron, southern France. The municipality was established on 1 January 2016 by merger of the former communes of Sainte-Geneviève-sur-Argence, Alpuech, Graissac, Lacalm, La Terrisse and Vitrac-en-Viadène.

See also 
Communes of the Aveyron department

References 

Communes of Aveyron